Dai Meng (born 8 February 1993 in Shanghai, China) is a Chinese idol singer. She is currently the co-captain of Team SII of female idol group SNH48 and member of its sub-units 7Senses.

Career
On 14 October 2012, during an SNH48 press conference, Dai was announced as one of the first-generation members of SNH48. On 23 December, SNH48 was invited to the inauguration ceremony of the Fudan University Student Union, and she made her first performance as an SNH48 member.

On 12 January 2013, Dai performed on SNH48 Research Students 1st Stage, "Give Me Power!", as a Research Student. On 25 May, she performed at the "Blooming For You" Concert. On 11 November, she was promoted to SNH48 Team SII, and on 16 December, she performed at the SNH48 Guangzhou Concert.

On 18 January 2014, Dai participated in the Red and White Concert, of which Team SII emerged as winner. On 26 July, during SNH48's first General Election, Dai came in 13th with 5785 votes, subsequently becoming part of the Senbatsu for their fifth single.

On 31 January 2015, Dai performed at SNH48 Request Hour Setlist Best 30 2015. On 25 July, during SNH48's second General Election, she came in 15th with 17907.3 votes, and became part of the senbatsu for that year. On 13 September, during the SNH48 Theater second anniversary concert, Dai was announced as the new captain of Team SII after Mo Han resigned due to personal reasons. On 31 October, Dai became part of SNH48's sub-unit Style-7.

In 2016, she became one of the ambassadors for AKG. On 23 July, she was involved in the filming of Heroes of Remix. On 30 July, during SNH48's third General Election, Dai came in 12th with 41,511.8 votes.

On March 19, Dai was announced as one of the members of SNH48's sub-unit 7SENSES. They released their first EP, "7SENSES" on April 20. On July 29, during SNH48's fourth General Election, Dai came in 11th with 53659.1 votes.

Discography

With SNH48

EPs

Albums
 Mae Shika Mukanee (2014)

Units

SNH48 Stage Units

Concert units

Filmography

Movies

Television series

Variety shows

References

External links
 Official Member Profile 
 
 

1993 births
Living people
SNH48 members
Japanese-language singers
Korean-language singers of China
Singers from Shanghai
Chinese film actresses
Chinese television actresses
21st-century Chinese actresses
Actresses from Shanghai
Youth With You contestants